Yelyzaveta Serhiivna Yakhno (born 4 June 1998) is a Ukrainian synchronised swimmer. She is World Championships medalist.

Career
Yakhno won three bronze medals at the inaugural European Games where she was third in duet, team and combination competitions.

At the 2017 World Aquatics Championships Yakhno in pair with outstanding Ukrainian synchro swimmer Anna Voloshyna won a bronze medal in duet technical routine which became her first major international achievement. Later she repeated her success in duet free routine. She also finished third in team free routine. The next day she won silver in the combination event.

In 2018, Yakhno and Anastasiya Savchuk won the silver medal in both the duet technical routine and duet free routine at the 2018 European Aquatics Championships.

References

1998 births
Living people
Ukrainian synchronized swimmers
World Aquatics Championships medalists in synchronised swimming
Synchronized swimmers at the 2017 World Aquatics Championships
Artistic swimmers at the 2019 World Aquatics Championships
European Aquatics Championships medalists in synchronised swimming
European Championships (multi-sport event) gold medalists
European Championships (multi-sport event) silver medalists
European Championships (multi-sport event) bronze medalists
European Games medalists in synchronised swimming
European Games bronze medalists for Ukraine
Synchronised swimmers at the 2015 European Games
Sportspeople from Donetsk
Synchronized swimmers at the 2020 Summer Olympics
Olympic synchronized swimmers of Ukraine
Olympic bronze medalists for Ukraine
Olympic medalists in synchronized swimming
Medalists at the 2020 Summer Olympics
21st-century Ukrainian women